Irina Lauric (born December 29, 1992 in Rădăuţi) is a Romanian sprint canoeist. Lauric is a member of the canoe and kayak team for ASC Olympia București, and is coached and trained by Iuan Sipos.

Lauric represented Romania at the 2012 Summer Olympics in London, where she competed in the women's K-2 500 metres. Lauric and her partner Iuliana Paleu paddled to an eighth-place finish and sixteenth overall in the B-final by 0.19 seconds, behind the Russian pair Natalia Lobova and Vera Sobetova, posting their time of 1:52.468.

References

External links
NBC Olympics Profile

1992 births
Romanian female canoeists
Living people
Olympic canoeists of Romania
Canoeists at the 2012 Summer Olympics
People from Rădăuți
Canoeists at the 2015 European Games
European Games competitors for Romania
20th-century Romanian women
21st-century Romanian women